Hebius arquus is a species of snake of the family Colubridae. The snake is found in Indonesia.

References 

arquus
Reptiles of Indonesia
Reptiles described in 2010